Diaphus dumerilii, Dumeril's lanternfish, is a species of lanternfish 
found in the Eastern Atlantic Ocean.

Size

Etymology
The fish is named in honor of Auguste Duméril (1812–1870), a herpetologist and an ichthyologist, of the Muséum national d’Histoire naturelle in Paris.

References

Myctophidae
Taxa named by Pieter Bleeker
Fish described in 1856
[[Category:Fish described in 1856